This is a list of closed secondary schools in New York. Also see :Category:Defunct schools in New York (state).

Grover Cleveland High School, Buffalo (former NCES ID )
Edison Technical High School, Rochester. Now home to several smaller specialized schools. Some former schools at this campus are listed below.
School For Business, Finance And Entrepreneurship (former NCES ID )
School Of Engineering And Manufacturing At Edison (former NCES ID )
School Of Imaging And Information Technology At Edison (former NCES ID )
Skilled Trades At Edison (former NCES ID )
Charles Grandison Finney High School, Buffalo. Was a private Christian school that apparently operated as recently as 2001.
Franklin High School, Rochester.  Now home to several smaller specialized schools. Some former schools at this campus are listed below.
Bioscience And Health Career HS At Franklin (former NCES ID )
Global Media Arts HS At Franklin (former NCES ID )
International Finance And Economic Develop HS At Franklin (former NCES ID )
Thomas Jefferson High School, Rochester
John Marshall High School, Rochester (Now All City)
Mesivta of Roslyn, Roslyn
Reejas Bais Yankov School, Hewlett
Salamanca Alternative School, Salamanca (closed at end of 2012 school year) 
Dr. Freddie Thomas High School, Rochester (former NCES ID ) - Currently Montessori Academy School No. 53.
Tryon Research Center, Johnstown 
Tryon Research Center for Girls, Johnstown
Villa Maria Academy, Buffalo (closed at end of 2006 school year)

References

 
New York
Closed